Kyungpook National University Law School is one of the professional graduate schools of Kyungpook National University, located in Daegu, South Korea. Founded in 2009, it is one of the founding law schools in South Korea and is one of the larger schools with each class in the three-year J.D. program having approximately 120 students. In the list of Best Global Universities, Kyungpook National University is rated #667. According to their performance across a number of generally recognized indices of quality, schools are ranked.

Programs

Kyungpook Law specializes in information technology law

References

Website 
 Official website

ko:경북대학교 법학전문대학원
Kyungpook National University
Law schools in South Korea
Educational institutions established in 2009
2009 establishments in South Korea